Five Deadly Venoms ('五毒' – Cantonese: Ng5 Duk6), also known as Five Venoms, is a cult 1978 Hong Kong martial arts film directed by Chang Cheh, starring the Venom Mob, with martial arts choreography by Leung Ting, and produced by the Shaw Brothers Studio, about five kung-fu fighters with unique animal styles: the Centipede, the Snake, the Scorpion, the Lizard, and the Toad (the Five Poisonous Creatures of Chinese folklore, from which the film takes its title). The film is considered one of the most popular martial arts films of its era and was listed at number 11 on Entertainment Weeklys Top 50 Cult Films list.

Plot

The dying master of the powerful Poison Clan dispatches his last pupil, Yang Tieh, on a crucial mission. Worried the skills he taught are being used for evil, he orders Yang to trace a retired colleague, Yun, and warn him that the fortune he amassed from the clan's activities is under threat from five of his former pupils, each an expert in his own lethal combat style. Yang must discover the whereabouts and true identities of these masked warriors, and decide which, if any, he can trust to join him in his mission.

The five pupils are the Centipede, Snake, Scorpion, Lizard, and Toad. Centipede and Snake were the master's first and second pupils and knew one another. Lizard and Toad were the fourth and fifth pupils respectively and also knew each other, but Scorpion, the third pupil, was unknown to the other four members. Before he dies, the master teaches Yang all the weaknesses of the five styles in order to give him a fighting chance.

The Centipede and the Snake come to the Yun family house to steal money before proceeding to butcher Yun's entire family when he refuses to divulge the location of his fortune. A witness sees the Centipede at the house. Later, the Scorpion investigates the scene and retrieves a hidden map. The Lizard, working as a policeman, recruits the Toad to help arrest the Centipede. After the Centipede is arrested and charged with murder, the Scorpion tells the Snake to frame the Toad for the murders.

The corrupt judge sends the Lizard away on government business while Snake pays off an officer to make the witness commit perjury, telling the judge he actually saw the Toad at the scene of the crime. The Toad refuses to confess, his kung-fu initially rendering him invulnerable to their attempts at torture, even when the Snake tries using a special torture device in order to counteract it. However, when that fails, the unseen Scorpion cripples the Toad by throwing a pair of darts at his weak points located behind his ears. Now vulnerable, the court subjects the Toad to further torture, leading to him passing out, after which his signature is forged on a confession.

With the Centipede acquitted for the murder charges, he goes free whilst an officer suffocates the Toad and hangs him in the cell to make it look as if he'd committed suicide. Afterwards, the Centipede and the Snake kill the witness and the corrupt officer in order to tie up any loose ends, but are both seen by two of the other policemen who go to a restaurant and tell the Lizard what happened whilst he was gone. The Lizard's supervisor, Chief Constable Ma, tries to encourage him to forget the issue, but the Lizard refuses. After identifying the Lizard and seeing his righteousness, Yang finally introduces himself and offers to work together with him to stop the other pupils; though hesitant at first, the Lizard eventually agrees and the pair work on techniques to defeat the others. As Yang and the Lizard prepare to confront the Centipede and the Snake, the Chief Constable arrives seeking to join them.

However, during the fight, he reveals himself to actually be the Scorpion and admits that he intends to kill everyone and claim the Yun fortune all for himself before jumping into the battle. The Scorpion manages to fatally injure the Snake and bribes the Centipede into helping him, however, Yang and the Lizard manage to defeat the Centipede while the Snake helps kill the Scorpion before he too dies. Once the fighting ends and the dust settles, Yang and the Lizard retrieve the Scorpion's map from his corpse and vow to use the fortune for good and restore the reputation of the Poison Clan.

Cast
 Chiang Sheng as Yang Tieh, the last student of the Venom House. Tasked with finding his late master's former students and killing them should they be using their skills for evil. Due to his rushed training caused by the illness of his master, Yang's fighting style is a mixture of the other five but is incomplete as a result. In order to succeed in his mission, he must ally with one of the other students in order to defeat the rest.
 Sun Chien as Gao Ji, the Scorpion/Chief Constable Ma. Known as pupil number three, Gao's fighting style revolves around the use of deadly kicks said to be capable of paralyzing (or even killing) a man in one hit; he also possesses an incredibly powerful grip and is proficient in the use of hidden throwing darts. He's the third of the students to die.
 Kuo Chui as Meng Tianxia, the Lizard/Constable He Yu. Known as pupil number four, Meng's fighting style allows him to defy gravity, allowing him to walk up and even stand on vertical surfaces in order to remain out of his opponent's reach whilst simultaneously attacking them from bizarre angles. Meng eventually joins forces with Yang and thus is the only student of the Venom House to survive.
 Lo Mang as Liang Shen, the Toad/Li Hao. Known as pupil number five, Liang's fighting style renders him nigh invulnerable to any kind of external harm while also making him inhumanly strong. However, despite the great power of his technique, Liang has a weak point located behind his ears which, if struck by an opponent, causes him to lose all his strength and become vulnerable. He's the first of the students to die.
 Wei Pai as Qi Dong, the Snake/Hong Wentong. Known as pupil number two, Qi apparently had money before he started training and (unlike Gao or his partner, Zhang) actually feels regret for his murders. His fighting style revolves around his one hand to deliver fast, high precision strikes to an opponent's vitals whilst using his other to redirect oncoming attacks as well as granting him superhuman levels of dexterity and flexibility. However, should he be attacked from two sides at once, he'll be unable to defend himself effectively. He's the second of the students to die.
 Lu Feng as Zhang Yiaotian, the Centipede/Tan Shan-kui. Known as pupil number one, Zhang's fighting style is focuses on unleashing a barrage of incredibly fast attacks, giving his blows the power to shatter bones and cause internal bleeding via overwhelming his opponent's with a swarm of rapid-fire punches and kicks. However, if he's attacked from both high and low at once he'll be left defenseless. He's the last of the students to die.
 Wang Lung-wei as Justice Wang
 Ku Feng as Bookkeeper Yuan
 Dick Wei as the dying Head of the Venom House

Styles
Each of the Poison Clan is alternatively referred to as either their Venom Style codename, or as their number in regard to the order of being taught by the master (except Yan, who refers to himself in one scene as "number 4", although the actor may have misspoke). Among fans, he is known as "Hybrid Venom", as his training contains bits and pieces of each of the other five styles, but is incomplete which is why he align with one of the Venoms in order to stand a chance against any of the others.

Number 1: Centipede - Wriggly and quick, this style is a nice blend of defensive and offensive posturing. The strikes are so fast that it is almost as if he has a hundred arms and legs. The weakness of this style as revealed by Yan Tieh is to attack both the opponent's upper and lower body in a simultaneous assault, since both portions are unable to exert the style's premised speed at the same time with each other.
Number 2: Snake - On one hand, the venomous mouth of the snake, fangs emulated in precise finger strikes designed to hit a target's vulnerable spots with pin-point accuracy; on the other: The rattling tail, uses to parry and knock away the opponent's attacks like a stinging whip. Masters of this particular style are known for their agility, being able to fight extremely well even while lying on their back. The weakness of this style as revealed by Yan Tieh is to stop the "head" and "tail" (the opponent's two arms) from combining, as neither the head nor tail can function well individually. This usually meant pinning the two limbs, at an angle, keeping them as far away from each other as possible.
Number 3: Scorpion - The Scorpion represents a double threat: Kicks from the Scorpion Style are just like the stinging tail of the namesake, when delivered by a master, a single kick can paralyze or even kill. Likewise the arms mimic the strong pincers of the poisonous arachnid, more then capable of crushing and snapping wood in half. Unlike the other five, the weakness of this Scorpion Style isn't clearly revealed as Yan Tieh's cut off during his explanation, but one can assume (by watching the Scorpion in his bout with Yan Tieh and the Lizard) that it's keeping out of reach from the user's damaging kicks and making them come to you. Although never confirmed, it's possible this style also teaches users how to use throwing weapons.
Number 4: Lizard - Placing an emphasis on mobility, users of the Lizard style are known for their ability to walk up and stand on walls, even being able to fight comfortably from such a position; maneuvering from one surface to another so as to avoid enemy assaults whilst also strengthening their own attacks by way of free-falling motion. Although never spoken of during the film, presumably the Lizard Style's weakness involves keeping the practitioner away from any vertical surfaces they could adhere themselves to and forcing them to fight on level ground.
Number 5: Toad - Through use of the Toad Style, a practitioner can make themselves invulnerable to just about any form of damage (such as slashing and piercing-based attacks) which also grants them enough strength to bend solid metal. The weakness of this style is that any master of the Toad Style has a "weak spot" that, when punctured, drains him/her of all the style's benefits; most notably their iron body. During his fight with the Snake, the Toad's points of weakness are shown to be his ears after the Scorpion secretly struck them with his darts. Some thought the only way to discover where a Toad Style user's vulnerable was to put him/her inside an iron maiden, but when the Toad was first placed in the iron maiden he was still impervious to the needles; only after the Scorpion and the Snake exploited the Toad's weak spot was he left defenseless.

Cultural references
In turn, they were brought into Power Rangers: Jungle Fury as the Five Fingers of Poison.
 The final track on 1993 2Pac album Strictly 4 My N.I.G.G.A.Z... references to the movie.
 In Kim's Convenience season 1, episode 7 ("Hapkido"), Mr Chin and Appa test each other's knowledge of kung fu movies. Mr Chin wins by citing Five Deadly Venoms, which Appa doesn't know; Gerald later confirms it as the "best kung fu movie ever".  
 This film is also referenced frequently in the works of the Wu-Tang Clan. Dialogue from the film is sampled in "Da Mystery Of Chessboxin'" from Enter the Wu-Tang (36 Chambers) and "Intro (Shaolin Finger Jab)" from The W. The movie is also sampled in songs appearing on solo albums by Wu-Tang Clan members: "Snakes" from Return to the 36 Chambers: The Dirty Version by Ol' Dirty Bastard, and "Born Chamber (Intro)" from No Said Date by Masta Killa. An all-female hip hop group affiliated with the Wu-Tang Clan, formed in 1997, was known as Deadly Venoms (originally called Five Deadly Venoms before the departure of one of the five members). 
 The 1999 album title and artwork by New York Metalcore act Merauder were inspired by the movie.
 In Power Rangers Jungle Fury a group of recurring villains is known as the "Five Fingers of Poison". The elite of Dai Shi's Rinshi, their members consist of Rantipede, Gakko, Toady, Stingerella, and Naja. They transform respectively into a centipede, gecko, toad, scorpion, and cobra.
 The 2009 EP Keywords for Robots by the band Wembley begins with a track called "Five Deadly Venoms".
 In Quentin Tarantino's Kill Bill, the five assassins of the Deadly Viper Assassination Squad are a reference to the Five Deadly Venoms.
In the 2010 film True Legend, the foster brother of Su (The Drunken Master), Yuan, has mastered the 5 Venom Fists. His dead father was using it to kill innocent people and was killed by Su's father to stop him. In another scene, they show Yuan putting his arms into nests with the five venom-creating creatures, and they inject and give it to him through his skin. They portray it as the source of his Qi.
It is the name of a poison shop in World of Warcraft'''s capital city, Stormwind.
A few scenes use music from the soundtrack of Monty Python and the Holy Grail''.

DVD release
The film received a DVD release by the Weinstein Company's Asian label, Dragon Dynasty, on 18 August 2009.

See also
 Venom Mob

References

External links
 
Venom Lo Mang's first visit to U.S. / Philadelphia, August 2007
HK Cinemagic entry

1978 films
1978 martial arts films
Hong Kong martial arts films
1970s Mandarin-language films
Kung fu films
Shaw Brothers Studio films
Films directed by Chang Cheh
1970s Hong Kong films